Parizaad is a Pakistani television series written by Hashim Nadeem, based on his novel of the same name, directed by Shahzad Kashmiri and produced by Momina Duraid Productions. It first aired on Hum Television from 20 July 2021. The series stars Ahmed Ali Akbar in the titular role alongside Yumna Zaidi, Ushna Shah, Saboor Aly, Urwa Hocane, Nauman Ijaz and Mashal Khan in prominent roles.

The last episode was aired in cinemas on 28 January 2022 and on television, 1 February 2022. According to some reports, a second season is in development.

The series received critical acclaim with praise towards the storyline and Akbar's performance, who later won Best Actor and Best Actor Popular awards at 8th Hum Awards and Best TV Actor-Critics' choice at 21st Lux Style Awards. It also won Best TV Play and Best TV Writer award at the latter.

Plot 

The story revolves around a dark-skinned college student, Parizaad. Parizaad is someone who has grown up with self esteem and confidence issues. Despite society's judgement of him, he is very hardworking, extremely respectful and well-mannered and creates a lasting impression on anyone he meets. This drama takes us along his journey of the friends and enemies he meets along his life as he tackles with his inner fight of choosing his true passion of poetry or choosing a realistic job that can provide income for his family. Parizaad is an innocent boy living in Rawalpindi with his brothers. Due to his dark skin, he is often ridiculed. His brothers and sister in laws are greedy and consider him to be a liability. Only his sister Saeeda loves him. But she is also married to an old man due to family pressure. Parizaad loves Naheed. But Naheed is in love with Majid.

One day Parizaad is falsely accused of giving a love letter to Naheed at her house. Naheed's father slaps Parizaad in front of everyone. After learning that Naheed loves Majid and it was Majid who was at her terrace that night, Parizaad wanted to kill himself, but is saved by Ahmad. On the other hand, Naheed gets married to Majid. After this he meets Bubly who considers herself to be a 'tomboy', As Parizaad is in desperately in need of money for his sister, he agrees to marry Bubly in order to get dowry. But before all this Bubly run's away from her house.

Then Parizaad meets Lubna, a rich girl and starts developing a liking for her, but her mother fixes her marriage with a rich businessman, she also rebukes Parizaad regarding his poetry and asks him to focus on becoming a rich man. Then Parizaad moves to Karachi where he starts working for a big business mafia, Behroze Karim. Behroze Karim has a wife named Layla. Layla is disloyal to Behroze and uses Parizaad's innocence so as to meet her lover. Behroze learns about this and he kills both Layla and her lover, but spares Parizaad. As Layla's lover was from a powerful background, hence Behroze gets trapped in his murder case. Behroze sends Parizaad to Guru so that Parizaad remains safe. There Parizaad meet Bubly who was adopted by Guru, Parizaad reconciles Bubly with her parents. After returning to Karachi, Parizaad takes all the blame and is sent to jail. Finally it is known that Behroze was the one who killed both Layla and her lover. Before being caught, Behroze kills himself and gives all his wealth to Parizaad as a reward for his loyalty.

After becoming rich and coming out of jail, Parizaad sees that now everybody respects him as now he is a wealthy man. Even people have no problem with his dark skin. His brothers and sister in laws due to their greed shows affection and love towards Parizaad. Parizaad again meets Lubna who is now a divorcee and a flop actress, Parizaad decides to finance her films. During this he also meets Ahmad. Parizaad now again meets Naheed who is now in a poor condition as her husband is now a good for nothing man. Naheed's father apologises to Parizaad as he is now aware that Parizaad was innocent that time. Parizaad arranges a job for Nahaeed's sister and for Majid. Naheed too now have a change in heart for Parizaad due to his wealth and tries to reconnect with him, which Parizaad declines.

At the end he meets Annie, a radio host, who is a blind girl and a die hard fan of Parizaad not because of his wealth but truly because of his poetry. Parizaad also develops a feeling for her, but is afraid that he might again get rejected due to his dark skin, once Annie gets back her eyesight. Annie's cousin, a new character, Sharjeel, also interferes with Parizaad's love, by confessing his plans to propose once Annie gets back her eyesight, not knowing Parizaad is in love with Annie. Parizaad in a moment of weakness decides to have Sharjeel killed by his bodyguard, Akbar, however his inner self stops him. Heartbroken once again realizing that even with money and power he is unable to capture true love, Parizaad leaves Karachi, leaving all his wealth. He starts to work as a teacher in a village away from modern life. No one knows about Parizaad's whereabouts as he discreetly leaves behind everything. Annie meets Parizaad while working as an news anchor, but fails to recognize him as he has changed his name. After hearing his voice and touching his face, she recognizes him and both of them confess their love for each other and the story ends with Parizaad finally getting his love. Annie and Parizaad plan on opening a Urdu academy in the Village. Annie plans on working as an assistant for the Urdu academy while starting her radio broadcast from the village.

Cast

Episodes

Soundtrack

The official soundtrack of the serial was composed by Waqar Ali and sung by Asrar while the lyrics were written by Hashim Nadeem.

Production 
Television actor Faysal Quraishi first decided to produce the series based on Hashim Nadeem's award-winning Parizaad, for which he approached a channel but was rejected. According to Quraishi, he wanted to cast Gohar Rasheed in the titular character at that time.

In May 2021, it revealed that Parizaad will get a television adaptation, produced by MD Productions and directed by Shahzad Kashmiri. The writer revealed about the show that it was actually written as an experiment, much like his previous show, Ishq Zahe Naseeb.

Ahmed Ali Akbar was chosen to portray the titular role of Parizaad. Akbar was not the first choice to portray the character. Likewise, the role of Naheed played by Ushna Shah was previously offered to Neelam Muneer who rejected it.

The initial teasers were released on 20 June 2021. The teasers received some negative reviews for making the lead character look darker than he actually is.

The filming was mostly done in real locations of Karachi and Islamabad. The university from Lubna's track in episodes 7-9 is the Capital University of Science & Technology, Islamabad. The mansion of Behroze Kareem which was shown from episode 10 onwards, was visited by fans, had an online tour available and after the show ended was on sale. Last spell of the show was filmed in Azad Kashmir.

Reception 
The show has received positive critical reviews since its inception. Ahmed Ali Akbar's performance received particular praise from critics and gained international acclaim as well. Social media user and critics praised the subtle take of the script on gender fluidity regarding transgender and bisexual. Its unique storyline made viewers hooked and it used to trend several times on twitter even in the unusual days.

Television rating (TRPs)

Sequel 

In June 2022, writer Hashim Nadeem revealed in a cryptic social media post that the show would be getting a second season.

Impact 

Due to last episodes of the series which deals with the poor conditions of Urdu medium schools in the farthest areas of the country, the Balochistan government promised to raise the standards of Urdu medium schools. Later, Ahmed Ali Akbar also shared the same on his social media account.

Awards and nominations

References

External links

 

Pakistani television series
Urdu-language television shows
Pakistani drama television series
2021 Pakistani television series debuts
2022 Pakistani television series endings
Hum TV original programming
Pakistani television dramas based on novels
Television shows set in Karachi
Television shows set in Islamabad